Parliamentary elections were held in Portugal on 16 December 1934, the first following the establishment of the one-party state known as the Estado Novo. The National Union was the only party to contest the elections, and no opposition candidates were allowed to run. It subsequently won all seats in the National Assembly, three of which were taken by women.

Electoral system
For the elections the country formed a single 100-member constituency. Suffrage was extended to all men aged 21 or over as long as they were literate or paid over 100 escudos in taxation, and to women aged over 21 if they had completed secondary education. However, only 8.2% of the population were registered to vote.

Results

References

See also
Politics of Portugal
List of political parties in Portugal
Elections in Portugal

Legislative elections in Portugal
Portugal
Legislative
One-party elections
Single-candidate elections
Portugal